The 24th South American Junior Championships in Athletics were held in Lima, Peru from August 21–23, 1992.

Participation (unofficial)
Detailed result lists can be found on the "World Junior Athletics History" website.  An unofficial count yields the number of about 191 athletes from about 10 countries:  Bolivia (9), Brazil (44), Chile (29), Colombia (9), Ecuador (17), Panama (4), Paraguay (3), Peru (45), Uruguay (3), Venezuela (28).

Medal summary
Medal winners are published for men and women
Complete results can be found on the "World Junior Athletics History" website.

Men

Women

Medal table (unofficial)

References

External links
World Junior Athletics History

South American U20 Championships in Athletics
1992 in Peruvian sport
South American U20 Championships
International athletics competitions hosted by Peru
1992 in youth sport